The First Republic of Armenia, officially known at the time of its existence as the Republic of Armenia, was the first modern Armenian state since the Middle Ages. The republic was established in May 1918, with its capital in the city of Yerevan, from the short-lived Transcaucasian Democratic Federative Republic in the Armenian-populated territories of the former Russian Empire known as Eastern or Russian Armenia.

In its first year of independence, Armenia was confined to a small territory around Lake Sevan after its invasion by the Ottoman Empire during the Caucasus campaign. Following the Armistice of Mudros, Armenia expanded its borders in the wake of the Ottoman withdrawal, leading to a short border war with neighbouring Georgia. During its first winter, hundreds of thousands of refugees in the country who had fled the Armenian genocide died from starvation or exposure. In the spring of 1919, Armenia, with British support, incorporated the formerly-occupied regions of Kars and Nakhchivan, thus more than tripling in size since independence; however, Armenian control of the latter collapsed during the Muslim uprisings that erupted in the summer of 1919.

In late 1919, the isolated Armenian region of Zangezur came under attack by neighbouring Azerbaijan, however, the fighting subsided until an Armenian uprising was launched in March of the following year in the Azerbaijani-controlled region of Nagorno-Karabakh, ending with the latter's sovietisation in April. In August 1920, Armenian representatives signed the Treaty of Sèvres, thus awarding the country an additional  of territory in Western Armenia, although, the treaty was never implemented. In late 1920, the republic was invaded by Turkish forces, ending with its partition and sovietisation by the Russian SFSR, with the latter founding the superseding Armenian Soviet Socialist Republic. Shortly thereafter, an anti-Bolshevik revolt resisted Soviet authority from February–July 1921.

In the two and a half years of its existence, Armenia formed diplomatic relations with 40 countries, gained de jure recognition, underwent parliamentary elections, and founded its first university. The nation's parliament and government were dominated by the broad Dashnak party (ARF), however, the cabinet posts were initially shared with the "bourgeois" Armenian Populist Party and later Social Revolutionaries.

Name 
Since gaining independence from the Soviet Union in 1991, the most commonly-used term in Armenia and modern historiography for the state is the First Republic of Armenia or the First Republic for short. Other names of the state include the Araratian Republic, Republic of Erivan, or Erivan Republic. These terms were often used by Ottoman Armenians and the Armenian diaspora because the country "was only a dusty province without Ottoman Armenia whose salvation Armenians had been seeking for 40 years". It has also been known as the Dashnak Republic due to the fact that the Dashnaks was the dominant political force in the country. During the Soviet-era, the communist-influenced Armenian academic circles, namely the Soviet Armenian Encyclopedia, referred to the state as the Bourgeois Republic of Armenia.

Background

Loss of statehood and national awakening 

Sources vary on when Armenian statehood was lost: Though the Armenian Kingdom of Cilicia ceased to exist in 1375, other sources suggest that Armenian statehood was lost in 1045 with the fall of Bagratid Armenia as Cilician Armenia was outside of the traditional Armenian homeland, while Bagratid Armenia was the last major independent Armenian state in the Armenian Highlands.

In the centuries after losing its independence, Armenia remained mostly under Muslim Turkic or Persian rule until the Russian annexation of the Karabakh Khanate in 1801 and khanates of Erivan and Nakhichevan in 1828. Owing to Russian colonial policy, more than 100 thousand Armenians from Persia and Turkey repatriated to Russian Armenia—specifically, the Erivan Governorate "regained an Armenian majority for the first time in several hundred years", whilst "Armenians had already been a majority in some areas such as mountainous Karabagh"; these areas would later "form the nucleus" of an independent Armenia.

Armenian nationalism was rooted in the "long textual tradition" of clerics and scholars. According to historians Edmund Herzig and Marina Kurkchiyan, "in the late eighteenth and through the nineteenth centuries a coherent sense of Armenians as a nation with a distinct and distinguished history was spread by patriots, teachers, writers, and revolutionaries".

The Russian offensive during the Caucasus campaign of World War I, the subsequent occupation and creation of a provisional administrative government gave hope for ending Ottoman Turkish rule in Western Armenia. With the help of several battalions of Armenians recruited from the Russian Empire, the Russian Imperial Army advanced as far as the city of Erzurum in 1916, continuing to make considerable advances even after the toppling of Tsar Nicholas II in February 1917.

Transcaucasian Democratic Federative Republic 

Following news of the October Revolution, the Ozakom (which was formed by the Russian Provisional Government to oversee the Caucasus) was superceded by a caretaker government known as the Transcaucasian Commissariat on 28 November 1917, which would later form the nucleus of the Transcaucasian Democratic Federative Republic (TDFR for short). As Russian and Turkish armies, despite the revolution, were still engaged in combat, the Transcaucasian Commissariat signed the Armistice of Erzincan on 18 December.

On 30 January 1918, the Ottoman Empire in violation of the armistice, launched an offensive to recapture Western Armenia; on 23 February, the Transcaucasian Seim was established. On 2 March, a delegation from the Seim was scheduled to depart to participate in the Trabzon Conference, however, by this time, the Treaty of Brest-Litovsk was signed, according to which, Kars and Batum were ceded to the Ottomans. From the outset of the conference, the Ottomans demanded that the Treaty of Brest-Litovsk serve as the basis of peace negotiations, which was only accepted weeks later on 5 April. Due to the delay, the Ottomans continued their advance, reaching the pre-war 1914 Russo-Turkish frontier by the end of March.

On 11 May, a new peace conference was convened in Batum; the Ottoman delegation stated that as the two states were in conflict, they would no longer recognise Brest-Litovsk and instead presented an alternative treaty by which the TDFR would be also obligated to cede western sectors of the Erivan and Tiflis governorates. Without awaiting the TDFR's consent to the new terms, the Ottomans resumed their offensive in Armenia on 21 May, leading to the battles of Abaran, Karakilisa, and Sardarabad, whereby local Armenian forces emerged victorious. In "avenging" their losses, the Turkish divisions defeated by Armenians massacred several thousand villagers. On 26 May, after secret negotiations with Germany, the Georgian delegates of the Seim declared the independence of Georgia—Azerbaijan followed suit two days later.

History

May – September 1918

Declaration of independence 

With the collapse of the TDFR due to the abandonment of the Georgians, the Armenian National Council, based in Tiflis and led by Russian Armenian intellectuals representing Armenian interests in the Caucasus, declared Armenia's independence on 28 May 1918. The council dispatched Hovhannes Kajaznuni and Alexander Khatisian, both Dashnaks, to Yerevan to assume power, and issued the following "intentionally vague" statement on 30 May (retroactive to 28 May):

With the success in the May battles in Abaran, Karakilisa, and Sardarabad, "many urged" Armenian commander Movses Silikian to chase out the Turks whilst the latter was on the run, however, Silikian refused and ordered his forces to halt. This is due to the fact that the Armenian forces' ammunition were nearly exhausted, and the Turks' reinforcements were "not distant". According to UCLA historian Richard G. Hovannisian, "If peace were not concluded and the tide of victory turned in favor of the Ottomans, the consequences would be disastrous".

Treaty of Batum 

Armenian negotiators on 30 May informed the Ottoman delegation at Batum that Armenia would accept Turkish conditions for peace, thereby initiating the Batum Conference between Armenia and the Ottoman Empire. When news of the Armenian victories at Abaran, Karakilisa, and Sardarabad reached the conference, the Ottomans agreed to a "minor territorial rectification" whereby an additional  in the Alexandropol uezd were relinquished "for the sake of the friendly relations that have begun". The Treaty of Batum was thereafter signed on 4 June.

In June 1918, German officials informed Armenian representatives in Istanbul that Germany would not recognise the Treaty of Batum. Though denying Armenia official recognition, Germany promised a conference whereby the treaties would be "revised". Armenian representatives in the Ottoman capital humbled themselves as to "expressing gratitude" to the unsympathetic Enver Pasha for tolerating the Armenian republic's establishment. Enver rejected any notion of the Armenian republic expanding its borders, observing that he had consented to "a small Armenian state that could never in any way affect the interests of the new Turkish empire".

October 1918 – June 1919

Armistice of Mudros 
On 30 October 1918, the Armistice of Mudros was signed, thus ending hostilities between the Ottoman Empire and the Allies. The armistice only stipulated the Ottomans' withdrawal to the Treaty of Brest-Litovsk boundaries, thereby allowing their armies to winter in Kars and Batum. Throughout November, Ottoman forces evacuated the Erivan Governorate, thereby, Armenia gained  of formerly-occupied territory.

An estimated 50–100 thousand Armenians were massacred during the Turkish invasion of May–September 1918. In the six-months of Turkish occupation of Eastern Armenia, particularly in the region of Pambak, Armenians were used as "bayonet practice" by Turkish soldiers, at least 8 thousand young men were taken to Erzurum for slave labour, and 125 thousand livestock, 30 thousand "farm implement", 6 thousand carts, and 18 thousand tons of foodstuffs were confiscated. Hovannisian wrote: "the richest districts … had been stripped bare of crops, animals, implements, and all other movable goods. Only a shadow of the former Armenian villages remained. Clothing, furniture, utensils, pottery, even doors and windows had been carted away. Not one operable locomotive or freight car remained along the entire railway line; every depot lay in shambles. Rubble filled the streets of Alexandropol as the result of the Turkish decision to detonate the powder and ammunition before the evacuation". He also added: "As the Armenian soldiers advanced, the full significance of the saying, 'the Turk has passed here,' was bruisingly demonstrated". As a result of the Turkish invasion, 200 vilages were "plundered", half the vineyards in the Aras River valley were "ruined", 200 thousand large-horned animals were "driven away" in addition to thousands of carts of "agricultural implements", and 80 percent of households were deprived of a horse and "nearly half" deprived of a cow or ox. In the Akhalkalaki uezd, which was claimed by Armenia, 60 of 110 thousand inhabitants had survived, "and more than seventy villages had been totally razed by the Turkish army in 1918".

Armeno-Georgian War 
On 18 October 1918, as the Ottoman Empire "prepared to capitulate", Armenian forces entered southern Lori and came into contact with German–Georgian forces, thereby, "the scene had been set for a military conflict between Georgia and Armenia". After this, the Georgian army bolstered its presence in the region.

The territorial conflict with Georgia was rooted in the contention over the counties of Akhalkalaki and Borchaly, particularly, the Lori subdistrict of the latter—both sectors possessed an Armenian ethnic majority. Under Georgian control, the Armenians of Lori were discontent due to their treatment by the soldiers—using this pretext, Armenia fomented insurrection, thereby elevating tensions.

Skirmishes began on 7 December, and escalated in Armenia's favour, with them coming within  of Tiflis, after which Allied representatives demanded a ceasefire. Armenia was unsuccessful in its objective of occupying lands up to the Khrami river and was pushed back by Georgian forces to the village of Sadakhlo by the time of the ceasefire which came into effect at midnight on 31 December. In spite of being pushed back in the last days of the war, Armenia was successful in loosening Georgian control over northern Lori, which the latter had held before the war, insomuch as the region was designated a neutral zone under British supervision.

Refugees and winter of 1918–1919 

Yale historian Firuz Kazemzadeh wrote that Armenia in the summer of 1918 was packed with "at least six hundred thousand refugees", one of the factors that led him to write that "of the three Transcaucasian republics Armenia suffered the greatest hardship in the fateful years 1918–1920". By December 1918, there remained 350 thousand refugees distributed throughout the Armenian republic in addition to 30 thousand who had accompanied Armenian partisan commander Andranik to Zangezur, historian Robert H. Hewsen places the number of refugees in Armenia in 1918 at 300 thousand. In February of the following year, the number of refugees fell to 263,393. During this period, there was a flow of Western Armenian refugees from Azerbaijan and the North Caucasus. In the spring of 1919, the number of refugees rose to 300 thousand, with 100 thousand residing in "makeshift shelters or abandoned military barracks" in Alexandropol alone. In November 1919, the number of refugees again rose, reaching 333,170 and consisting of 284,870 Western Armenians and 48,300 Eastern Armenians. In April of the following year, the number of refugees declined to 310,835. By 1920, almost half of Armenia's population of 720 thousand consisted of refugees.

By the time relief aid reached Armenia, some 150–180 thousand refugees (20 percent of the population) had perished due to famine, exposure, or hunger. According a report from February 1919, 40 percent of the inhabitants of the district of Sardarapat had died. By April 1919, 40 percent of the inhabitants of eight villages near Etchmiadzin and 25 percent of the sixteen villages in Ashtarak perished. During the winter, the population of the district of Talin declined by 50 percent, and nearly 60 percent of Armenians in Surmalu died of starvation. American historian Richard Pipes writes that Soviet estimates place the number of Armenians who perished due to famine and disease at 300 thousand. In 1919, 19 thousand inhabitants of Yerevan contracted typhus and 10 thousand died from exposure, famine, and pestilence. By mid-1919, 200 thousand inhabitants of Armenia had perished; according to Hovannisian, there were 8.7 births and 204.2 deaths per 1,000 persons, yielding a net loss of 195.5—"it was verily a land of death".

Annexation of Kars and Nakhchivan 

The Ninth Army of the Ottoman Empire occupied the Kars Oblast at the time of the Armistice of Mudros, being permitted to winter in the district until early 1919; on 7 January 1919, the British ordered their complete withdrawal to the pre-war Russo-Turkish border. Intended to hinder the westward expansion of the fledgling Armenian and Georgian republics into the Kars Oblast, the Ottomans backed the establishment of the Southwest Caucasus Republic with moral support, also furnishing it with weapons, ammunition, and instructors. The Southwest Caucasus Republic administered the entire Kars and Batum oblasts as well as neighbouring occupied districts for some three months before provoking British intervention, leading to its capitulation by Armenian and British forces on 10 April 1919. British toleration of the state dissolved after the latter defied its directives and Muslim insurgents backed by the latter resisted Georgian forces in the counties of Akhalkalaki and Akhaltsikhe, leading the Georgian government to unite with Armenia in opposing the state's existence. Consequently, the Kars Oblast (excluding western Olti and northern Ardahan) was annexed to Armenia, falling under the civil governorship of —this allowed for the repatriation of 60 thousand Armenians (out of more than 100 thousand had fled in April 1918). As a result of the annexation, Armenia increased its territory to "more than ".

The Ottoman Empire also sponsored the creation of the Republic of Aras within in the Muslim-dominated southern districts of the Erivan Governorate corresponding to Nakhchivan. Following the conclusion of the 2-week Armeno-Georgian War, Armenia repositioned its forces to annex the Republic of Aras, however, their advance into the district was halted by the establishment of a British governorship in the district, formed as a means to prevent clashes between Armenian soldiers and local Muslims of up to "ten thousand well-armed men". British sympathy to the Aras Republic was reversed under the authority of Major-General William Montgomerie Thomson who suspected Pan-Turkic influence in Nakhchivan due to the presence of Azerbaijani and Ottoman envoys. Thomson believed that Azerbaijan and Turkey were scheming to "forge a bridge between the Ottoman Empire and Azerbaijan and ultimately between Nationalist Turkey and Soviet Russia".  was appointed to become the civil governor of the district. Armenia's annexation of Nakhchivan was announced on 3 May 1919, after which Armenian forces commanded by Drastamat Kanayan (Dro) advanced southward into the district along the railway. On 13 May 1919, Armenian prime minister Alexander Khatisian arrived in Nakhchivan to discuss terms of capitulation with the minister of war of the Aras Republic, thereby, effecting the annexation.

July 1919 – January 1920

Muslim insurgencies 

Beginning in July 1919, a series of insurgencies against Armenian rule erupted in the Kars and Nakhchivan regions, fostered by Azerbaijani and Turkish envoys who instructed local Muslims to resist. The insurgencies were motivated by the British military withdrawal from Armenia which took place in mid-June. The town of Böyük Vedi and the village cluster around it served as a symbol of defiance for Muslims in Armenia. As the insurgencies raged, the Azerbaijani diplomatic envoy to Armenia, transferred funds to the insurgents and apprised the Azerbaijani government of developments—earlier, he had worked to forestall the Armenian annexation of Nakhchivan.

Investigations by American relief workers confirmed the reports of large-scale massacres of the local Armenians in the Nakhchivan region, amounting to 10 thousand dead and 45 villages destroyed. During the insurgencies, only the Volunteer Army of Anton Denikin sent ammunition to replenish the Armenian army. By late 1919, Armenia lost control of the peripheries of the Kars and Surmalu regions, as well as the entirety of Nakhchivan.

Armenian–Azerbaijani war 

In 1918, after attaining independence from Russia, the newly established Armenian and Azerbaijani republics engaged in a two-year war over their territorial ambitions. The disputed regions were principally Nakhchivan, Zangezur, and Nagorno-Karabakh. If Armenia successfully incorporated the highlands of Elizavetpol, its population, "according to pre-war statistics", would rise to 1.797 million, including 1.169 million Armenians. According to Hovannisian, a population exchange whilst practical was deemed "preposterous" for the Karabakh Armenians because the region's cession "to the Pan-Turanian fanatics will open the door to endless invasions, endanger the peace of the Orient, and shake the political equilibrium off its foundations".

Nagorno-Karabakh, despite initially being self-governed, capitulated to British–Azerbaijani pressure and become an autonomous part of Azerbaijan, by virtue of the agreement signed on 22 August 1919, pending the Paris Peace Conference's decision on the inter-Caucasian borders. Before Nagorno-Karabakh's capitulation, Azerbaijani forces carried out a massacre of 600 Armenians in villages nearby Shusha to pressure the region's inhabitants into submission.

Andranik, who had been tasked with the defence of Erzurum, denounced the Dashnaks and Armenia for their treachery in seeking peace after gaining the upper hand in battle, seeing them as becoming "nothing more than an Ottoman vassal state". With his 3-thousand-strong force, Andranik "pushed over Nakhichevan into Zangezur", where he remained for the duration of the war, destroying Tatar villages and expelling their inhabitants. Thereby, the Armenians "retained control in Zangezur". In early November 1919, Azerbaijan launched a campaign to incorporate the region and absorb Muslim-controlled Nakhchivan, however, were forced to retreat some days later due to their defeat in battle, despite initially meeting success on all fronts.

Diplomacy 

According to Hewsen, Armenia's foreign policy objectives consisted of "obtaining foreign aid to prevent its people from perishing, … securing international recognition … and … placing Armenia under the protection of a specific foreign power". Despite the US sending $11 million in aid to Armenia, the vote for an American mandate over Armenia was rejected by the senate on 1 June 1920. At the Paris Peace Conference, the Armenian delegation led by Avetis Aharonian from the republic united with the delegation from the Armenian diaspora, headed by Boghos Nubar, forming the "Delegation of Integral Armenia". With Greek and Russian backing, Armenia claimed territories of the defeated Ottoman Empire covering the Six Vilayets and Cilicia. The White Russian delegation, whilst refusing to tolerate the independence of Azerbaijan and Georgia, was willing to allow Russian Armenia to unite with Turkish Armenia, believing that "such a united Armenia will be our friend and even ally in the East". Greek prime minister Eleftherios Venizelos was a "staunch champion of the Armenians" and constantly kept their delegation apprised of developments.

Armenian relations with Azerbaijan were strained by overlapping territorial claims coupled with ethnic cleansing conducted by both sides. Throughout August 1919, Armenian militias were exacting "retribution from the most vulnerable Muslim settlements", sacking large Muslim villages, and according to Azerbaijani diplomats, massacring the men of six villages and destroying "300 Muslim villages … since the beginning of 1918". Conversely, tens of thousands of Armenians in the Zakatal, Geokchay, Shemakha, Nukha, and Aresh districts of Azerbaijan were massacred in 1918, forcing inhabitants of the latter two districts to gather in the 3 remaining Armenian villages (of 51 originally); in Baku, Ottoman–Azerbaijani forces slew some 15 thousand Armenians in the September Days massacre, in retribution for the March Days massacre of thousands of Azerbaijanis. Despite these atrocities, a peace agreement was signed in Tiflis under the auspices of Georgia and the United States in order to end the Azerbaijani campaign against Zangezur. In the areas claimed by Armenia and disputed with Azerbaijan and Georgia, there were 410 thousand Armenians, 460 thousand Muslims, and 36 thousand others, totalling 906 thousand.

Despite the initial difficulties in Armenia–Georgia relations due to their overlapping territorial claims over Lori, Akhalkalaki, Ardahan, and Olti, the two governments signed a transit treaty on 3 November 1919 which was "substantive and immediate in its economic implications" The Armenians in Georgia who numbered 500 thousand were "resented" by the Georgians due to the former's "decades-long … dominance in Tiflis". In the Georgian capital, the Armenians had suddenly become a "disadvantaged minority", most who were civil servants were dismissed, and refugees and families were evicted from the city. In discussions of a territorial settlement, the Armenian negotiators ultimately offered to drop their claim on the Akhalkalaki district in return for the entirety of the Lori neutral zone, however, Georgia was only willing to drop its claims on the districts of Olti and southern Lori.

During its independence, Armenia established diplomatic relations with 40 countries. On 10 January 1920, on account of the defeat of the Volunteer Army, the League of Nations and the Supreme Allied Council formally recognised Georgia and Azerbaijan as de facto governments over the region, with Armenia's recognition following on 19 January, in a last-ditch effort to prevent the sovietisation of the South Caucasus.

February – July 1920

Karabakh rebellion 

As the Paris Peace Conference was inconclusive on the status of Nagorno-Karabakh, Azerbaijani governor-general Khosrov bey Sultanov dissolved the region's autonomy and on 19 February 1920 issued an ultimatum to the local Armenians to accept permanent inclusion within Azerbaijan. The ultimatum was accepted by 45 Armenian representatives in Shusha, however, was rejected by representatives who had gathered in Shosh who "categorically rejected any possibility of union with Azerbaijan". Receiving news that Azerbaijan intended to "move against Zangezur" again on 25 March, agents from the Armenian republic organised an "abortive" rebellion in Karabakh that led to the massacre and displacement of Shusha's Armenian population. The Armenian rebels failed to oust Azerbaijani garrisons in Khankend and Shusha, however, the countryside of Nagorno-Karabakh was under local control. The Azerbaijani army, despite the Red Army being stationed on its frontiers, moved towards Karabakh to put down the rebellion. The Armenian army was ordered by Yerevan to assist the rebels, however, an ultimatum by the Red army—which supplanted the Azerbaijani army following the latter's sovietisation—prompted an Armenian retreat from Nagorno-Karabakh. The region's Armenian inhabitants blamed the Armenian republic's agents and the Dashnaks for "dislocation and ruin" that came as a result of the uprising.

As a result of "Turkish–Azerbaijani aggression", Nagorno-Karabakh's population had declined by 20 percent in 1918–1920. Since 1920, Azerbaijani forces carried out massacres against Armenians in Khankend on 22 February 1920 leaving 400 dead, and Shusha from 22–26 March 1920 leaving 500 dead. By 11 April 1920, 30 villages in Nagorno-Karabakh had been "devastated" by Azerbaijani forces as a result of the uprising, leaving 25 thousand homeless (including nearly 6 thousand refugees from Shusha).

On 5 April 1920, to relieve pressure in Karabakh, Azerbaijani forces in Qazax initiated 2-week-long border clashes with Armenia during which they occupied strategic heights, and occupied and burned Armenian villages. Though a ceasefire was reached on 9 April, Azerbaijani forces occupied several other villages, whilst accusing Armenia of attacking Azerbaijani settlements. On 18 April, officials from Dilijan and Qazax agreed on an 11-point ceasefire agreement that included the repatriation of all displaced residents and the restoration of the former boundary, thereby ending the clashes.

May Uprising 

Encouraged by the Red Army invasion of Azerbaijan in late April 1920, the Armenian Bolsheviks headed by Avis Nurijanyan staged a revolt in May. The events preceding the revolt started on 1 May 1920, International Workers' Day, with the Bolsheviks demonstrating against the Dashnak government in various cities. The revolt escalated after the armoured train Vardan Zoravar and its crew under the command of Captain  joined the Bolshevik rebels who had formed a revolutionary committee and proclaimed Armenia a Soviet state in Alexandropol on 10 May. The Bolshevik rebels also seized control in Kars and Sarıkamış. On 5 May 1920, Khatisian's cabinet resigned and a new one was formed under the leadership of Hamo Ohanjanyan, made up entirely of Dashnaks. The parliament gave up its rights to the government since Armenia was under state of emergency. Sebouh Nersesian was appointed commander to suppress the revolt. On 13 May, Sebouh's unit reached Alexandropol; by the next day the rebels fled the city whilst government forces entered and established order.

The leaders of the revolt, including Sargis Musayelyan and Ghukas Ghukasyan, were initially imprisoned as the Soviet government on 4 June warned the Armenian government that diplomatic relations would be "detrimented" if the "persecution of Communists continued" and due to the fact that several notable Dashnaks were imprisoned in Russia and Azerbaijan at the time. Moreover, Armenia's domestic situation deteoriated as the government lost its prestige. In Soviet historiography, the uprising was "extensively glorified and sharply criticized", the latter due to its poor organisation and irresolution—critics agreed that "Bolshevism in Armenia existed only in the heads of intellectuals"

Summer campaigns 
Having no expectation that the ultimatum would be answered, the Armenian army launched an offensive to recapture the rebelling villages on the following day; the Armenians were victorious on 21 June and had secured the peripheries of Yerevan, leading the Azerbaijani population to flee into the neighbouring Surmalu uezd to Aralık to avoid retribution.

Occurring simultaneously with the Armenian counteroffensive against insurgents near Yerevan, an attempt was made to seize the coal reserves in Penek. Armenian policy towards integration of Muslim areas was split between peaceful civilian incorporation with local autonomy and military invasion and threats, ultimately, the latter policy prevailed in the case of Penek. Armenian and Turkish reports confirmed the presence of Turkish soldiers operating in the district; in spite of this, the Armenian offensive to capture the western half of the Olti district began on 19 June 1920. By 22 June, the Armenian army had converged on Penek and ousted its Turko-Kurdish defenders, setting the new Armenian–Turkish frontier at the Oltu river.

The voices of the militaristic factions in the Armenian government were strengthened by the successes in Zangibasar and Penek, therefore, the army prepared to retake the districts of Vedibasar and Nakhchivan; the advance into the former began on 11 July and by the next day, Armenian forces had recaptured the district and Boyuk Vedi, reaching the boundary of the Erivan and Sharur-Daralayaz districts at the mountain pass known as the Volchi vorota—this again caused the local Muslims to flee, now southward to Sharur. On 14 July, the Armenian advance continued through the Volchi vorota into the Sharur district, capturing it 2 days later whilst the locals fled across the Aras river into Iran. By this time, the 11th Army of Soviet Russia which had previously sovietised Azerbaijan reached southern Nakhchivan to form a link with Kemalist Turkey. Colonel Tarkhov, the commander of the "united troops of the Soviet Russia and Red Turkey in Nakhichevan" addressed the Armenian army in Şahtaxtı, proclaiming Soviet rule over the rest of Nakhchivan, thereby ending the Armenian campaign.

August – December 1920

Recognition 

As no country was willing to assume the mandate over Armenia, the peace conference decided to only assign it the vilayets of Erzurum, Van, Bitlis, and Trebizond, with the precise boundary to be arbitrated by American president Woodrow Wilson. Although the Pontic Greeks were unhappy with the decision to assign Pontus to Armenia, "Greek and Armenian officials were confident that the issue could be resolved through adequate guarantees for an autonomous administration in the Pontus". On 10 August 1920, Armenian representatives in Paris signed the Treaty of Sèvres, thereby granting it de jure recognition and assigning it , thus expanding Armenia's borders to "60,000 square miles or 155,000 square kilometers, roughly equivalent to the country of Czecho-Slovakia or the state of Illinois". During the League of Nations's discussions regarding Armenia's application to join the organisation, it was stated that "Wilson's award might expand the territory from the existing 70,551 square kilometers, or 26,305 (actually 27,232) square miles, to as much as 214,000 square kilometers, or 80,000 (actually 82,604) square miles". According to Hewsen, the Ottoman territory awarded to Armenian totalled . For the Armenia–Azerbaijan–Georgia territorial disputes, Article 92 of the treaty provided for the arbitration of frontiers by the "Principal Allied Powers" if the states couldn't determine it themselves through "direct agreement" by the time of the delineation of Armenia's western frontier.

On 10 August 1920, the same day that Armenia signed the Treaty of Sèvres which set their western frontier, a treaty with Soviet Russia was signed which set their "preliminary" eastern frontier; the agreement provided for an end to Soviet–Armenian clashes in Zangezur and Qazax, for Armenia to "occupy" the Şahtaxtı–Xok–Aznabyurt–Bardzruni–Kükü–Gorayk line and in Qazax, "the line they held on 30 July" of 1920. The treaty also recognised Karabakh, Nakhchivan, and Zangezur as disputed districts that Russia was to occupy without prejudicing the permanent border settlement. Armenia, in reaction to the "furor" among Allied circles caused by the treaty, stated that "In view of the extraordinary pressure exerted from all sides and the fact that the Armenian army was alone and heavily outnumbered, the government had accepted the temporary arrangement in order to win some time. Armenia would nonetheless maintain its firm anti-Bolshevik policies".

Turkish invasion 

After the provisional Ottoman government failed to win support for ratification of the Treaty of Sèvres, remnants of the Ottoman Army’s XV Corps under the command of Kâzım Karabekir, who had orders from the Ankara Government to "eliminate Armenia physically and politically", invaded Armenia on 28 September 1920. After unsuccessful Turkish manoeuvres in Sarıkamış, Armenian military command, not believing its 2.5 thousand and 1.5 thousand man garrisons in Sarıkamış and Olti-Merdenek, respectively, were enough to hold those positions, evacuated the former, falling back to Selim where they believed the Turks would strike. Accompanying the civilian population, Armenian forces retreated eastwards to more defensible positions. After Karabekir announced his successes to Kemal, the latter ordered a temporary halt to the invasion, fearful of Allied or Russian intervention.

The Turkish victory had indicated that "the Armenians had underestimated the Turkish resistance movement and overestimated their own strength and potential". On 30 September, Armenia mobilised men up to 35-years-old. The Turkish attacks on Merdenek, Sarıkamış, and Kağızman displaced some 50 thousand Armenians. According to American High Commissioner Mark Bristol, "the Armenians had started the trouble by moving into Olti in the summer". Though the Georgian press had denounced the Turkish invasion, Georgia was averse to "tie its fate with that of the beleaguered Armenians". Turkish envoys assured the Georgian government that Turkey would present no threat to them, and wouldn't object to Georgia occupying "certain territories in contention with Armenia". Georgia had already attempted to assert its authority in Armenian-held Ardahan, though with limited success.

During the war, the Armenian army fielded 40 thousand men, including 33 generals, more than 2 thousand officers, and 66 colonels. However, the army's structure was "top-heavy with a large, conservative officer corps accustomed to classical battle strategies". On 14 October, the Turkish army resumed its offensive, reaching the Merdenek-Selim-Kağızman line. On 27 October, Karabekir attacked towards Kars, flanking the Armenians. On 24 October, a concerted Turkish attack began on Surmalu, however, Dro's forces repelled the attack on 26 October. by 29 October, Kars was surrounded on three sides, however, was well armed and prepared to withstand an assault. The military council of Kars prohibited the 40 thousand inhabitants of the city from evacuating "not to undermine troop morale or give cause for panic". On 30 October, the Turkish army occupied the city of Kars, "which was supposed to be impregnable", "it was to be the last day the Armenian flag would fly over the citadel of Kars". According to a French source, "fatigue, starvation, lack of clothing and equipment" disorganised the 25 thousand men defending Kars, enabling its capture by 12 thousand Turks. The fall of Kars led to the capture of thousands of officers, 2 thousand of whom were taken to Erzurum for forced labour and internment. There were 1,500 Armenian casualties after the attack, of whom 500 were killed.

In the span of two months, Armenia "lay prostrate in defeat"; Karabekir imposed on Armenia the Treaty of Alexandropol on 3 December 1920, whereby the latter denounced the Treaty of Sèvres and was confined to the province of Yerevan, thereby ceding Kars, Nakhchivan, and Surmalu. The other terms of the treaty effectively made Armenia a Turkish puppet state. However, the treaty was later declared null by the new authorities in Yerevan who had sovietised the country the previous day.

"In consequence of Turkish, and, presumably, Communist, massacres", 200 thousand Armenians were massacred. Another estimate places the number of Armenians massacred by the Turkish army during the war at 100 thousand. Turkish–German historian Taner Akçam mentions a 1961 Soviet encyclopedia that places the death toll at 198 thousand. An estimate by historian Christopher J. Walker places the number of Armenians massacred between 1919 and 1922 at "probably" 250 thousand. According to Soviet historian Zaven Korkotyan, the territory of present-day Armenia had a population of 961,677 in 1919, indicating that Armenia lost 241,677 or 25 percent of its population from 1919 to its sovietisation in late 1920.

Sovietisation 

With Sergo Ordzhonikidze's approval, Revkom units advanced into Armenia from Qazax on the night of 28–29 November 1920. On 29 November, the Revkom issued its declaration, proclaiming Soviet rule in Armenia—the declaration began as follows:

According to Hovannisian, the declaration "emphasized the beginning of a new era in relations with Azerbaijan and Turkey … The establishment of Soviet order in Armenia would lead to the elimination of all disputed questions and the end of bloodshed among the Armenian and Azerbaijani workers and peasants". On 30 November, Azerbaijani revolutionary Nariman Narimanov issued a decree stating that "Mountainous Karabagh, Zangezur, and Nakhichevan have to be considered a part of the Armenian Socialist Republic"—this cession was done "because boundaries had no meaning among the family of Soviet peoples".

On 2 December 1920, due to the threat of a Soviet ultimatum to the Armenian government, the transfer of power was arranged at 6 o'clock in the evening, whereby, Armenia would be "proclaimed an independent socialist soviet republic … the entire administrative order in Armenia" would pass to the Revkom, "members of the party Dashnaktsutiun and of other socialist parties in Armenia will not be subjected to any repression for their belonging to these parties", and "the Government of Soviet Russia will take immediate measures to concentrate the military forces needed to defend the independence" of Armenia.

As the Treaty of Alexandropol had been signed after the establishment of Soviet rule in Armenia and hadn't been ratified, the Revkom "quickly repudiated" it. In January 1921, in violation of the terms of the sovietisation, "much of the officer corps" were sent into exile in Russia. On 28 February, whilst the Red army incited a revolt in Georgia, anti-Soviet insurgents led by the erstwhile prime minister Simon Vratsian gained control of the countryside of Yerevan, forcing the Red Army to retreat. Vratsian made appeals to the West and Turkey, calling the latter to honour its commitment in the Treaty of Alexandropol to come to Armenia's aid, however, all were unanswered; after conquering Georgia, the Red army turned its attention to the revolt. On 2 April, "thousands of fighters and civilians" moved towards Zangezur for a final stand. Alexander Miasnikian, the head of the Armenian Revkom offered amnesty and assurances regarding the retention of Zangezur to Mountainous Armenia—on 16 July 1921, the rebels folded, retreating over the Aras river into Iran. If Armenia had held onto Kars, similarly to Georgia had held Batumi, it "might have been incorporated into Soviet Armenia". According to Vratsian, Armenia had been caught between "the Bolshevik hammer and the Turkish anvil".

Demographics

Population 
In 1918, by virtue of the Treaty of Batum, Armenia was confined to a territory of  containing 679 thousand inhabitants, in addition to 600 thousand refugees. Although no census was taken in Armenia during its brief independence, its population in 1918 was reliably estimated to be 900 thousand—500 thousand were native Russian Armenians, 300 thousand were Ottoman Armenian refugees, and 100 thousand were Muslims (predominantly Azerbaijanis, Turks, and Kurds). According to historian George Bournoutian, the official figures for the ethnic composition of the Armenian republic in 1918 were the following: Armenians – 669,871; Tatars – 365,841; Turks – 8,000; Kurds – 36,508; Yazidis – 12,624; Russians, Georgians, Greeks, and Roma – 21,854.

By the time of its collapse, Armenia had a population of 1.5 million in the territory of most of present-day Armenia, the Kars and Iğdır provinces, and the Çıldır and Göle districts of the Ardahan Province of Turkey, and "disputed control" of Nakhchivan, Nagorno-Karabakh, Zangezur, Qazax, Oltu, and Lori. According to the 1922 publication of the Encyclopædia Britannica, Armenia in 1919 (consisting of parts of the Erivan and Kars provinces) had a population of 1.51 million.

As a result of "wars and civil clashes, hunger and diseases" of 1918–1920, 432 thousand people or 36 percent of the population were "exterminated". By the time of Armenia's sovietisation, it had a population of 720 thousand, little more than 10 thousand of whom were Turks. Before the autumn of 1922, 60 thousand Turks were repatriated to Armenia—"no less than 200 thousand" Turks and Kurds had been driven from Armenia due to the Dashnaks' policy of "cleansing".

On the territory of present-day Armenia
According to Korkotyan, the 1919 "census" was "full of a thousand and one errors". The data recorded a population of 723,827 Armenians (including 162,044 immigrants), 127,748 Muslims (including 25,852 immigrants), 41,097 non-Muslims (including 7,482 immigrants), and 19,570 mixed population (including 5,830 immigrants), yielding a total population of 912,242; however, according to historian Grigor Grigoryan's calculations, the actual population was 917,297: 715,192 were Armenians, 122,185 were Muslims, 48,672 were non-Muslims, and 31,352 were mixed population. The distribution of population on the territory of present-day Armenia in 1919 was as follows:

Refugees

Government 

In May 1920, the First Republic of Armenia was administratively divided into the following provinces:
Ararat – composed of the districts of Erivan, Surmalu, Etchmiadzin (without the Talin subdistrict), Sharur-Daralayaz, and Nakhichevan. Its governors in chronological order were Paruir Levonyan, Sahak Torosyan, and Levon Bek Amirkhanyan.
Shirak – composed of the districts of Alexandropol, Talin, Dilijan, Akhalkalaki (controlled by Georgia), and the Aghbaba subdistrict of the Kars Oblast. Its governor was Garo Sassouni.
Vanand – composed of the Kars Oblast (without the Aghbaba subdistrict and northern Ardahan). Its governor was Stepan Ghorghanyan.
Syunik – composed of the highland districts of the Elizavetpol Governorate (without the Dilijan district), including Zangezur and Nagorno-Karabakh.

Parties 

The dominant party in Armenian politics was the Armenian Revolutionary Federation or Dashnaks—their monopoly in this sphere was confirmed through the 1919 Armenian parliamentary election. The Dashnaks held almost all posts in every cabinet of the Armenian republic, however, the organisation was not only "not a monolithic organization but had served as a broad umbrella in the cause of national emancipation", but also, was originally "created as a revolutionary society to emancipate the Turkish Armenians, it was neither structured as nor intended to evolve into a legal ruling organism". The party also suffered from "contradictions between nationalism and socialism" and "a widening rift between intellectuals and partisan chief"—despite these factors, the Dashnaks placed "great importance on showing a solid front".

The liberal Constitutional Democrats or Ramgavar opposed class-warfare in the face of suffering due to foreign oppression—the party had a "militant tradition" due to absorbing the Armenakan Party and a faction of the Reformed Hunchak Party. The Armenian Populist Party, formed in 1917 from the Russian Kadets were "purely bourgeois and antirevolutionary", and shared the posts of the second cabinet with the Dashnaks and "advanced a program of liberal, evolutionary reforms and drew its adherents primarily from among the professional-commercial classes of Tiflis and Baku".

Bolsheviks in Armenia boycotted the Armenian parliamentary elections, branding Armenian democracy "bourgeois parliamentarianism", thereby it was evident that "radicals" were in control of the Armenian branch. In the latter half of 1919, Bolsheviks expelled from Georgia gathered in Armenia; in all, there were some 500 Bolsheviks in Armenia with little coordination with one-another. Akin to their colleagues throughout the former Russian Empire, they opposed Armenia's independence and sought the country's reunion with Russia.

The Social Democrat Hunchakian Party was the only Marxist party that had significant Eastern and Western Armenian membership. However, following the events of World War I, Eastern Armenian Hunchaks became Mensheviks or Bolsheviks—by this time, the party in the Caucasus was held together by a "small circle of old loyalists and a few refugee members from Van". The Western Armenians "found repugnant the 'Russianism' of the Erevan republic and its native inhabitants", also believing that "the government and capital of liberated Armenia should be located in Karin (Erzerum), Van, or even a major center in Cilicia, but certainly not in Erevan".

Armenian Social Democrats were divided into 5 groups due to disagreements regarding the "tactics and interpretations of Marxism". The Social Democrats were further weakened by the Bolshevik–Menshevik split, by virtue of which they remained aligned with the Mensheviks. Internationalist  led the Armenian branch of the Menshevik Social Democrats, however, he was exiled from Tiflis after criticising the seccessionist and nationalist principles of the Georgian Mensheviks and died in Yerevan from typhus weeks later—"Menshevism in Armenia evaporated with the death of its most eloquent and persuasive proponent". The Social Democrat branch known as the Specifists "maintained that unique historic and political factors affecting the Armenians justified a separate Armenian approach to socialism and a distinct national Marxist party within the international movement". In January 1920, they founded the "Social Democrat Labor Party of Armenia"; unlike the Bolsheviks and Mensheviks, the Specifists welcomed Armenian independence and strove for scientific socialism. Specifist Davit Ananun in ridiculing the Ramkavar's focus on Western Armenia believed that it "depended on the survival and strengthening" of the Eastern Armenian republic.

The Social Revolutionaries or SRs had similar socio-economic views to the ARF and were composed of many former-Dashnaks who had left the ARF due to its focus on the emancipation of Western Armenia. Before the Russian Revolution, the SRs "decried the chauvinism and racial strife" and called for a united front against the autocracy of the Tsar—despite their appeals, they "scarcely made a ripple in the Armenian provinces". Whilst sympathetic to Soviet Russia, the majority of SRs didn't recognise the legitimacy of the Sovnarkom, vowing to continue its opposition to the Dashnaks in a legal form—thereby, they "became little more than an innocuous, perhaps even a useful, annoyance" to the Dashnaks.

Act of United Armenia 
On 28 May 1919, on the first anniversary of the Republic of Armenia, the government of the newly founded country symbolically declared the union of Eastern and Western Armenia, the latter of which was still under the full control of the Turks. The declaration, read by Alexander Khatisian, is as follows:

Military 

Owing to the efforts of Armenian National Council of Tiflis, the Armenian National Corps was established to fight against the Ottoman offensive of late 1917 and early 1918. On 13 December 1917, the Armenian National Corps was established, with General Tovmas Nazarbekian was appointed commander and Drastamat Kanayan became the defence minister. Nazarbekian used his experience in the Russian Caucasus Army to aid in the creation of the regular army. Units of this corps formed the basis of the Armenian army. Armenian conscripts and volunteers from the Russian Army later established the core of the armed forces of the First Republic. In accordance with the harsh terms of the Treaty of Batum, the Ottoman Empire demobilised most of the Armenian army, only allowing a limited force, also severely restricting where Armenian troops could operate.

Foreign arms 
In 1920, Armenian representatives abroad sought arms, aeroplanes, and military advisors to reorganise and increase the size of the Armenian army to 40 thousand men. The British government eventually agreed to supply Armenia with arms in order to relieve themselves of the responsibility of enforcing the terms of the Treaty of Sèvres for Armenia. The arms shipped to Armenia valued at  included 40 thousand uniforms, 25 thousand Ross rifles, 440 Vickers machine guns, 57,500,000 small arms ammunition, and 1,077 "packages of medical supplies". However, as Armenia was landlocked, it depended on Georgian rail to receive supplies, therefore, it was negotiated to share 27 percent of the supplies with Georgia. The arms were received in Armenia six months after the Allied Supreme Council had decided to furnish Armenia with arms, yielding a "great moral boost". Though unsuccessful in obtaining military advisors, it was planned that the Armenian army would be reorganised into 3 divisions consisting of 30 thousand infantrymen consisting of 3 brigades made up of 3 battalions; moreover, 2 thousand cavalrymen would be made up of "5 regiments of 400 sabres each"; the artillery would consist of 3 thousand men, and the remaining 5 thousand into "other services". Though Armenians abroad had financed the purchase of two French fighter planes, the British in Batum impounded the fighters in March 1920 until they were released weeks later.

Achievements 
The government organised an agricultural cooperation agency known as the HayCop or Hai-Koop on 1 July 1919. According to Hovannisian, "the union’s executive was instructed to stress the working-class nature of the movement by excluding rich peasants (kulaks) and developing facets of the rural economy which benefited the toilers". The Hai-Koop, which came as an "amalgamation" of consumer cooperative groups, strove to serve as "local agencies of production and distribution, as intermediaries between the government and primary producers, and as mainstays of communal self-improvement and popular democracy". The organisation was headed by intellectuals of Marxist and other backgrounds. Notable members of the cooperative published a biweekly journal called Hayastani Kooperatsiia By the end of 1919, the cooperative represented 60 thousand households and included 200 member associations.

In 1920,  of telegraph lines were repaired throughout the country, and new lines were planned to interconnect Kars, Karakilisa, and Zangezur. The telegraph line expansion was so expansive that the government authorised the creation of a separate ministry to oversee it in January 1920. Roads were repaired to become fit for car-usage. By November 1919, daily passenger service via train was available between Armenia and Georgia.

In late 1918, Armenia adopted a structure of a national judiciary whereby there would be "elected tribunals of conciliation to handle small claims and minor disputes", and a legal hierarchy consisting of a circuit court of the first instance, as the appelate court – the Palace of Justice, and the supreme court of cassation – the Senate. The requirement of the adoption of the Armenian language in all government institutions "presented a more serious challenge" for jurists trained in the Russian language.

In May 1919, the government adopted a plan to establish the country's first university with faculties of history and philology, law, medicine, and physical sciences—it was opened on 31 January 1920 and classes began on 1 February with 8 professors and 200 students. The university was temporarily located in the Alexandropol "school of commerce" until the next academic year. The minister of education and culture, Nikol Aghbalian, declared that "with the opening of the historico-philological branch of the state university, Armenia was taking a major step toward restoring the old, traditional bonds with the great civilizations of the West".

The Social Revolutionary and Social Democrat parties in the Armenian parliament attempted to restrict the Armenian church's traditional role in education—members of both parties desired the abolishment of parochial schools. Only the Populists defended the right of the church in the educational system. The Dashnak government, however, refused to appropriate church-owned properties "based on the right of educational freedom", stating that education would be "secular in nature with allowance for optional religious training". Dashnak deputy Sahak Torosyan, in "voicing the opinion of most Dashnakist deputies", stated that "there was little to fear from the Church because Armenian liberalism had already overthrown the political and social power of the religious establishment. It might still have a spiritual hold, but there were other ways of dealing with that issue". The parliament eventually legislated the church's right to "retain schools that were already in operation".

Legacy 
The Sardarapat Memorial at the site of the Battle of Sardarabad is the symbol of the First Republic. Every year on May 28, Armenia's political leadership and thousands of ordinary people visit the memorial to celebrate the restoration of Armenian statehood.

In his Antranik of Armenia short story, Armenian-American writer William Saroyan writes about the First Republic of Armenia. "It was a small nation of course, a very unimportant nation, surrounded on all sides by enemies, but for two years Armenia was Armenia, and the capital was Erivan. For the first time in thousands of years Armenia was Armenia".

See also 
Aftermath of World War I

Notes

References

Bibliography

External links

First Republic of Armenia
Armenian nationalism
Modern history of Armenia
Former countries in Western Asia
Former countries of the interwar period
Former republics
Post–Russian Empire states
1918 in Armenia
1919 in Armenia
1920 in Armenia
States and territories established in 1918
States and territories disestablished in 1920
1918 establishments in Armenia
1920 disestablishments in Armenia
1918 establishments in Asia
1920 disestablishments in Asia
1918 establishments in Europe
1920 disestablishments in Europe
20th century in Armenia
Armenian-speaking countries and territories
Former socialist republics